Firangi is a 2017 Indian Hindi-language historical drama film written and directed by Rajiev Dhingra. It stars Kapil Sharma, who is also the producer, along with Ishita Dutta and Monica Gill. The film was shot primarily in Punjab and Rajasthan and had a worldwide release on 1 December 2017. The film received mixed reviews from critics.

Plot
In the 1920s, Mangatram "Manga" is an uneducated and jobless young man who dreams of joining the Police Force but fails at every attempt made to do so. During a visit to the village Naku Guda for his friend Heera's wedding, Manga comes across Sargi and falls in love with her, but because of being jobless Manga is unable to take forward his relationship with Sargi.

Manga was born with a unique ability that he could cure anyone's backache with a simple kick to their backside. One day he manages to cure Englishman Mark Daniel of his backache using the same ability of his. Impressed by this act of Manga, Mark offers him a job in the Police Force, which Manga happily accepts. Manga is now convinced that since he has a job now, Sargi's family won't object to his marriage with her and so he approaches Sargi's grandfather Lalaji with regards to this. But Lalaji, who is a follower of Mahatma Gandhi, refuses the proposal because Manga is working for the British, the very same people with whom the people of the Naku Guda are fighting against for their freedom.

Cast
 Kapil Sharma as Mangatram "Manga"
 Ishita Dutta as Sargi
Monica Gill as Princess Shyamali Devi
 Edward Sonnenblick as Mark Daniels
 Kumud Mishra as Raja Inderveer Singh
 Inaamulhaq as Heera
 Neeta Mohindra as Maharani/Mother of Shyamali Devi
 Rajesh Sharma
 Aanjjan Srivastav as Lala Ji
 Jatinder Kaur as Grandmother of Manga
 Jameel Khan
 Vishal O Sharma
 Maryam Zakaria as item number "Gulbadan"
 Roshni Walia as Nimmo
 Hagupreet Singh
 Ghulam Hussain

Production
According to the film director Rajiev Dhingra and producer Kapil Sharma, the idea behind making Firangi was to tell a story set in pre-partition era without making the freedom movement of India, which was prevalent at that time, as its focal point. Kapil said that most films set in pre-independence era have been about the freedom struggle and the tragedies that took place at that time, so they decided to make a story which would focus on the day-to-day lives of people and the simple moments of happiness that they shared with each other.

Release
Initially, the film was set to release on 10 November 2017, however on 12 October 2017 it was announced that the film would be releasing on 24 November 2017. On 21 November, the release date was again postponed due to the delay in obtaining a censor certificate from the Central Board of Film Certification. After obtaining a U/A certificate from the CBFC, Firangi was released on 1 December 2017.

Soundtrack

The soundtrack of Firangi is composed by Jatinder Shah while the lyrics have been penned by Dr. Devendra Kafir except one song Gulbadan, lyrics by Ashraf Ali and Krishna Bhardwaj. The first song of the film "Oye Firangi" sung by Sunidhi Chauhan was released on 27 October 2017. The second track of the film titled as "Sajna Sohne Jiha" sung by Jyoti Nooran was released on 2 November 2017. The third single to be released was "Sahiba Russ Gayiya" which is sung by Rahat Fateh Ali Khan was released on 9 November 2017. The music of the film was officially released by Zee Music Company on 21 November 2017 which includes 6 songs.

Reception

Critical response
, Firangi holds a 14% approval rating on review aggregator website Rotten Tomatoes, based on seven reviews with an average rating of 3.67 out of 10. Subhash K. Jha gave the film a rating of 4 stars out of 5, and called it "Deliriously Enjoyable Even For Non-Kapil Fans!". He further stated that "Those who think Kapil's days are numbered should make it a point to see what unrehearsed energy he brings to even the most mundane conversation about a bar of soap." Rajeev Masand of News18 gave the film a rating of 1.5 stars out of 5 and said that, "Firangi is a bloated two-hour forty minute exercise designed to suggest that Kapil Sharma can act but to survive the film you need to be chained to your seat with toothpicks holding up your eyelids". Shristi Negi of News 18 gave the film a rating of 1.5 stars out of 5 and said that, "The random execution of the movie fails to add anything of interest to the plot. Even with great supporting cast like Aanjjan Srivastav and Rajesh Sharma, the film feels frustratingly disjointed.". Sweta Kausal of Hindustan Times gave the film a rating of 1 star out of 5 and said that, "the boring narrative, an incoherent screenplay and mismatch between milieu and discourse in certain scenes of the film make it an extremely mind-numbing affair". Saibal Chatterjee of NDTV gave the film a rating of 2 stars out of 5 and criticized the film for its excessive length and inconsistent screenplay and said that, "Neither the comic potential at the core of the film nor the energy of Kapil Sharma's antics is enough to pull it out of the irremediable mess it degenerates into.".

Renuka Vyavahare of The Times of India gave the film a rating of 2 stars out of 5 saying that, "Firangi moves at a snail's pace leading us to a semi-fun climax. Sadly, the film doesn't even fall into 'so bad, it's good' category. It is outright boring and thus not even perversely entertaining". Shubhra Gupta of The Indian Express gave the film a rating of 2 stars out of 5 and said that, "The trouble with this mildly engaging film, with a solid supporting cast, is that it is far too long.". Bollywood Hungama gave the film a rating of 2 stars out of 5 saying that, "On the whole, due to its weak script and lack of comedy Firangi fails to leave a lasting impression. Besides this, the long run time of 161 mins will leave the audiences impatient and restless.".

Nandini Ramnath of Scroll criticized the movie saying that, "At 160 minutes, Rajiev Dhingra's movie is highly overstretched, and squanders its comic potential despite having a comedian as its hero." Aman Khurana of Times Now gave the film a rating of 2 stars out of 5 and said that, "Packed with unappealing performances and a done-to-death storyline, Firangi is a below average affair."

Accolades

References

External links
 
 

Indian historical comedy-drama films
Films set in the 1920s
Films shot in Rajasthan
Films set in the British Raj
Films scored by Jatinder Shah
2010s Hindi-language films